A patch is a set of changes to a computer program or its supporting data designed to update, fix, or improve it. This includes fixing security vulnerabilities and other bugs, with such patches usually being called bugfixes or bug fixes. Patches are often written to improve the  functionality, usability, or performance of a program. The majority of patches are provided by software vendors for operating system and application updates.

Patches may be installed either under programmed control or by a human programmer using an editing tool or a debugger. They may be applied to program files on a storage device, or in computer memory. Patches may be permanent (until patched again) or temporary.

Patching makes possible the modification of compiled and machine language object programs when the source code is unavailable. This demands a thorough understanding of the inner workings of the object code by the person creating the patch, which is difficult without close study of the source code. Someone unfamiliar with the program being patched may install a patch using a patch utility created by another person who is the Admin. Even when the source code is available, patching makes possible the installation of small changes to the object program without the need to recompile or reassemble. For minor changes to software, it is often easier and more economical to distribute patches to users rather than redistributing a newly recompiled or reassembled program.

Although meant to fix problems, poorly designed patches can sometimes introduce new problems (see software regressions). In some special cases updates may knowingly break the functionality or disable a device, for instance, by removing components for which the update provider is no longer licensed.

Patch management is a part of lifecycle management, and is the process of using a strategy and plan of what patches should be applied to which systems at a specified time.

Types

Binary patches 
Patches for proprietary software are typically distributed as executable files instead of source code. When executed these files load a program into memory which manages the installation of the patch code into the target program(s) on disk.

Patches for other software are typically distributed as data files containing the patch code. These are read by a patch utility program which performs the installation. This utility modifies the target program's executable file—the program's machine code—typically by overwriting its bytes with bytes representing the new patch code. If the new code will fit in the space (number of bytes) occupied by the old code, it may be put in place by overwriting directly over the old code. This is called an inline patch. If the new code is bigger than the old code, the patch utility will append load record(s) containing the new code to the object file of the target program being patched. When the patched program is run, execution is directed to the new code with branch instructions (jumps or calls) patched over the place in the old code where the new code is needed. On early 8-bit microcomputers, for example the Radio Shack TRS-80, the operating system includes a PATCH/CMD utility which accepts patch data from a text file and applies the fixes to the target program's executable binary file(s).

The patch code must have place(s) in memory to be executed at runtime. Inline patches are no difficulty, but when additional memory space is needed the programmer must improvise. Naturally if the patch programmer is the one who first created the code to be patched, this is easier. Savvy programmers plan in advance for this need by reserving memory for later expansion, left unused when producing their final iteration. Other programmers not involved with the original implementation, seeking to incorporate changes at a later time, must find or make space for any additional bytes needed. The most fortunate possible circumstance for this is when the routine to be patched is a distinct module. In this case the patch programmer need merely adjust the pointers or length indicators that signal to other system components the space occupied by the module; he is then free to populate this memory space with his expanded patch code. If the routine to be patched does not exist as a distinct memory module, the programmer must find ways to shrink the routine to make enough room for the expanded patch code. Typical tactics include shortening code by finding more efficient sequences of instructions (or by redesigning with more efficient algorithms), compacting message strings and other data areas, externalizing program functions to mass storage (such as disk overlays), or removal of program features deemed less important than the changes to be installed with the patch.

Small in-memory machine code patches can be manually applied with the system debug utility, such as CP/M's DDT or MS-DOS's DEBUG debuggers. Programmers working in interpreted BASIC often used the POKE command to alter the functionality of a system service routine or the interpreter itself.

Source code patches 
Patches can also circulate in the form of source code modifications. In this case, the patches usually consist of textual differences between two source code files, called "diffs". These types of patches commonly come out of open-source software projects.  In these cases, developers expect users to compile the new or changed files themselves.

Large patches 
Because the word "patch" carries the connotation of a small fix, large fixes may use different nomenclature. Bulky patches or patches that significantly change a program may circulate as "service packs" or as "software updates".  Microsoft Windows NT and its successors (including Windows 2000, Windows XP, Windows Vista and Windows 7) use the "service pack" terminology. Historically, IBM used the terms "FixPaks" and "Corrective Service Diskette" to refer to these updates.

History 

Historically, software suppliers distributed patches on paper tape or on punched cards, expecting the recipient to cut out the indicated part of the original tape (or deck), and patch in (hence the name) the replacement segment. Later patch distributions used magnetic tape.  Then, after the invention of removable disk drives, patches came from the software developer via a disk or, later, CD-ROM via mail. With widely available Internet access, downloading patches from the developer's web site or through automated software updates became often available to the end-users. Starting with Apple's Mac OS 9 and Microsoft's Windows ME, PC operating systems gained the ability to get automatic software updates via the Internet.

Computer programs can often coordinate patches to update a target program. Automation simplifies the end-user's task they need only to execute an update program, whereupon that program makes sure that updating the target takes place completely and correctly. Service packs for Microsoft Windows NT and its successors and for many commercial software products adopt such automated strategies.

Some programs can update themselves via the Internet with very little or no intervention on the part of users. The maintenance of server software and of operating systems often takes place in this manner. In situations where system administrators control a number of computers, this sort of automation helps to maintain consistency. The application of security patches commonly occurs in this manner.

Application
The size of patches may vary from a few bytes to hundreds of megabytes; thus, more significant changes imply a larger size, though this also depends on whether the patch includes entire files or only the changed portion(s) of files. In particular, patches can become quite large when the changes add or replace non-program data, such as graphics and sounds files. Such situations commonly occur in the patching of computer games.  Compared with the initial installation of software, patches usually do not take long to apply.

In the case of operating systems and computer server software, patches have the particularly important role of fixing security holes.  Some critical patches involve issues with drivers.  Patches may require prior application of other patches, or may require prior or concurrent updates of several independent software components. To facilitate updates, operating systems often provide automatic or semi-automatic updating facilities. Completely automatic updates have not succeeded in gaining widespread popularity in corporate computing environments, partly because of the aforementioned glitches, but also because administrators fear that software companies may gain unlimited control over their computers. Package management systems can offer various degrees of patch automation.

Usage of completely automatic updates has become far more widespread in the consumer market, due largely to the fact that Microsoft Windows added support for them, and Service Pack 2 of Windows XP (available in 2004) enabled them by default.  Cautious users, particularly system administrators, tend to put off applying patches until they can verify the stability of the fixes. Microsoft (W)SUS supports this. In the cases of large patches or of significant changes, distributors often limit availability of patches to qualified developers as a beta test.

Applying patches to firmware poses special challenges, as it often involves the provisioning of totally new firmware images, rather than applying only the differences from the previous version.  The patch usually consists of a firmware image in form of binary data, together with a supplier-provided special program that replaces the previous version with the new version; a motherboard BIOS update is an example of a common firmware patch. Any unexpected error or interruption during the update, such as a power outage, may render the motherboard unusable.  It is possible for motherboard manufacturers to put safeguards in place to prevent serious damage; for example, the update procedure could make and keep a backup of the firmware to use in case it determines that the primary copy is corrupt (usually through the use of a checksum, such as a CRC).

Video games
Video games receive patches to fix compatibility problems after their initial release just like any other software, but they can also be applied to change game rules or algorithms. These patches may be prompted by the discovery of exploits in the multiplayer game experience that can be used to gain unfair advantages over other players. Extra features and gameplay tweaks can often be added. These kinds of patches are common in first-person shooters with multiplayer capability, and in MMORPGs, which are typically very complex with large amounts of content, almost always rely heavily on patches following the initial release, where patches sometimes add new content and abilities available to players. Because the balance and fairness for all players of an MMORPG can be severely corrupted within a short amount of time by an exploit, servers of an MMORPG are sometimes taken down with short notice in order to apply a critical patch with a fix.

Companies sometimes release games knowing that they have bugs. Computer Gaming Worlds Scorpia in 1994 denounced "companies—too numerous to mention—who release shoddy product knowing they can get by with patches and upgrades, and who make pay-testers of their customers".

In software development
Patches sometimes become mandatory to fix problems with libraries or with portions of source code for programs in frequent use or in maintenance. This commonly occurs on very large-scale software projects, but rarely in small-scale development.

In open-source projects, the authors commonly receive patches or many people publish patches that fix particular problems or add certain functionality, like support for local languages outside the project's locale. In an example from the early development of the Linux kernel (noted for publishing its complete source code), Linus Torvalds, the original author, received hundreds of thousands of patches from many programmers to apply against his original version. 

The Apache HTTP Server originally evolved as a number of patches that Brian Behlendorf collated to improve NCSA HTTPd, hence a name that implies that it is a collection of patches ("a patchy server"). The FAQ on the project's official site states that the name 'Apache' was chosen from respect for the Native American Indian tribe of Apache. However, the 'a patchy server' explanation was initially given on the project's website.

Variants

Hotfix 

A hotfix or Quick Fix Engineering update (QFE update) is a single, cumulative package that includes information (often in the form of one or more files) that is used to address a problem in a software product (i.e., a software bug). Typically, hotfixes are made to address a specific customer situation. Microsoft once used this term but has stopped in favor of new terminology: General Distribution Release (GDR)  and Limited Distribution Release (LDR). Blizzard Entertainment, however, defines a hotfix as "a change made to the game deemed critical enough that it cannot be held off until a regular content patch".

Point release 

A point release is a minor release of a software project, especially one intended to fix bugs or do small cleanups rather than add significant features. Often, there are too many bugs to be fixed in a single major or minor release, creating a need for a point release.

Program temporary fix 

Program temporary fix or Product temporary fix (PTF), depending on date, is the standard IBM terminology for a single bug fix, or group of fixes, distributed in a form ready to install for customers. A PTF was sometimes referred to as a “ZAP”.
Customers sometime explain the acronym in a tongue-in-cheek manner as permanent temporary fix or more practically probably this fixes, because they have the option to make the PTF a permanent part of the operating system if the patch fixes the problem.

Security patches 
A security patch is a change applied to an asset to correct the weakness described by a vulnerability. This corrective action will prevent successful exploitation and remove or mitigate a threat's capability to exploit a specific vulnerability in an asset. Patch management is a part of vulnerability management the cyclical practice of identifying, classifying, remediating, and mitigating vulnerabilities.

Security patches are the primary method of fixing security vulnerabilities in software. Currently Microsoft releases its security patches once a month, and other operating systems and software projects have security teams dedicated to releasing the most reliable software patches as soon after a vulnerability announcement as possible. Security patches are closely tied to responsible disclosure.

These security patches are critical to ensure that business process does not get affected. In 2017, companies were struck by a ransomware called WannaCry which encrypts files in certain versions of Microsoft Windows and demands a ransom via BitCoin. In response to this, Microsoft released a patch which stops the ransomware from running.

Service pack 

A service pack or SP or a feature pack (FP) comprises a collection of updates, fixes, or enhancements to a software program delivered in the form of a single installable package. Companies often release a service pack when the number of individual patches to a given program reaches a certain (arbitrary) limit, or the software release has shown to be stabilized with a limited number of remaining issues based on users' feedback and bug tracking such as Bugzilla. In large software applications such as office suites, operating systems, database software, or network management, it is not uncommon to have a service pack issued within the first year or two of a product's release. Installing a service pack is easier and less error-prone than installing many individual patches, even more so when updating multiple computers over a network, where service packs are common.

Unofficial patches 

An unofficial patch is a patch for a program written by a third party instead of the original developer. Similar to an ordinary patch, it alleviates bugs or shortcomings. Examples are security fixes by security specialists when an official patch by the software producers itself takes too long. Other examples are unofficial patches created by the game community of a video game which became unsupported abandonware.

Monkey patches 

Monkey patching means extending or modifying a program locally (affecting only the running instance of the program).

Hot patching 

Hot patching, also known as live patching or dynamic software updating, is the application of patches without shutting down and restarting the system or the program concerned. This addresses problems related to unavailability of service provided by the system or the program. 
Method can be used to update Linux kernel without stopping the system.
A patch that can be applied in this way is called a hot patch or a live patch. This is becoming a common practice in the mobile app space. Companies like Rollout.io use method swizzling to deliver hot patches to the iOS ecosystem. Another method for hot-patching iOS apps is JSPatch.

Cloud providers often use hot patching to avoid downtime for customers when updating underlying infrastructure.

Slipstreaming 
In computing, slipstreaming is the act of integrating patches (including service packs) into the installation files of their original app, so that the result allows a direct installation of the updated app.

The nature of slipstreaming means that it involves an initial outlay of time and work, but can save a lot of time (and, by extension, money) in the long term. This is especially significant for administrators that are tasked with managing a large number of computers, where typical practice for installing an operating system on each computer would be to use the original media and then update each computer after the installation was complete. This would take a lot more time than starting with a more up-to-date (slipstreamed) source, and needing to  download and install the few updates not included in the slipstreamed source.

However, not all patches can be applied in this fashion and one disadvantage is that if it is discovered that a certain patch is responsible for later problems, said patch cannot be removed without using an original, non-slipstreamed installation source.

Software update systems 

Software update systems allow for updates to be managed by users and software developers. In the 2017 Petya cyberpandemic, the financial software "MeDoc"'s update system is said to have been compromised to spread malware via its updates. On the Tor Blog, cybersecurity expert Mike Perry states that deterministic, distributed builds are likely the only way to defend against malware that attacks the software development and build processes to infect millions of machines in a single, officially signed, instantaneous update. Update managers also allow for security updates to be applied quickly and widely. Update managers of Linux such as Synaptic allow users to update all software installed on their machine.  Applications like Synaptic use cryptographic checksums to verify source/local files before they are applied to ensure fidelity against malware.

See also 
 Software release life cycle
 Software maintenance
 Backporting
 Dribbleware
 Patch (Unix)
 Porting
 Vulnerability database
 Delta encoding
 SMP/E
 Automatic bug fixing
 White hat (computer security)

References

External links 
 The Jargon File version 4.4.7 entry for patch
 A detailed masters dissertation dealing with security patches
 Official Linux kernel patch format
 0-Day Patch - Exposing Vendors (In)security Performance  a metric comparing patch performance of Microsoft and Apple

Software maintenance
Software release